Calice may refer to:

 CALICE (Calorimeter for Linear Collider Experiment), a research and development organization
 , an Austrian noble family
 Calice Becker (fl. 1990–2014), French perfumer
 Calice, an alternative name for the calyx in cnidarians
 "Cálice", a song by Chico Buarque
 Calice Ligure, a commune in Italy
 Calice al Cornoviglio, municipality in the Province of La Spezia in the Italian region Liguria

See also
 Chalice (disambiguation)
 Calyx (disambiguation)